Seyi or Shay is the debut studio album by Nigerian singer-songwriter Seyi Shay. Formerly scheduled for release on 13 November 2015, the album was later shifted to 16 November 2015. Seyi or Shay was preceded by five singles and features vocals from Patoranking, Wizkid, Shaydee, Iyanya, Flavour and Banky W.

Concept and background
The concept behind Seyi or Shay expresses both sides of Seyi Shay as a person and a music artist. Released through Island Records and Stargurl Limited, the album generally features vocals from Femi Kuti, Wizkid, Iyanya, Banky W, Olamide, Patoranking, D'Banj, Sound Sultan, Timaya and Cynthia Morgan, with music productions from Legendury Beatz, Pheelz, Dokta Frabz, Tee-Y Mix, Harmony Samuels and Del B.

Promotion
On 10 November 2015, Seyi Shay released a video trailer which served as a teaser in promotion of the album. The video clip depicts the two sides of her. On 13 November 2015, a listening party for the album was hosted at the Eko Hotels and Suites, with notable artists like Banky W, Cynthia Morgan, Iyanya, Toke Makinwa, Eva Alordiah and Paul Okoye in attendance.

Track listing

Accolades

References

2015 debut albums
Seyi Shay albums
Albums produced by Pheelz
Albums produced by Legendury Beatz
Albums produced by Del B
Albums produced by Dokta Frabz
Albums produced by Harmony Samuels
Albums produced by Tee-Y Mix
Igbo-language albums
Yoruba-language albums